José Benincasa (born 16 June 1891, date of death unknown) was a Uruguayan footballer. He played in 40 matches for the Uruguay national football team from 1910 to 1925. He was also part of Uruguay's squad for the 1919 South American Championship.

References

External links
 

1891 births
Year of death missing
Uruguayan footballers
Uruguay international footballers
Place of birth missing
Association football defenders
Club Atlético River Plate (Montevideo) players
Boca Juniors footballers
Peñarol players
Uruguayan expatriate footballers
Expatriate footballers in Argentina